In geometry, a nephroid is a specific plane curve. It is a type of epicycloid in which the smaller circle's radius differs from the larger by a factor of one-half.

Name
Although the term nephroid was used to describe other curves, it was applied to the curve in this article by Richard A. Proctor in 1878.

Strict definition 
A nephroid is 
 an algebraic curve of degree 6. 
 an epicycloid with  two cusps 
 a plane simple closed curve = a Jordan curve

Equations

Parametric

The complex map  maps the unit circle to a nephroid

Proof of the parametric representation
The proof of the parametric representation is easily done by using complex numbers and their representation as complex plane. The movement of the small circle can be split into two rotations. Hence the 

.
Herefrom one gets
 
(The formulae  were used. See trigonometric functions.)

Implicit 
Inserting  and  into the equation

shows that this equation is an implicit representation of the curve.

Proof of the implicit representation
With

one gets

Orientation 
If the cusps are on the y-axis the parametric representation is 

and the implicit one:

Metric properties 
For the nephroid above the
arclength is 
area   and
radius of curvature is 
The proofs of these statements use suitable formulae on curves (arc length, area and radius of curvature) and the parametric representation above

and  their derivatives 

Proof for the arc length
 .

Proof for the area
 .

Proof for the radius of curvature

Construction
 It can be generated by rolling a circle with radius  on the outside of a fixed circle with radius . Hence, a nephroid is an epicycloid.

Nephroid as envelope of a pencil of circles 

Proof
Let  be the circle  with midpoint  and radius . The diameter may lie on the x-axis (see diagram). The pencil of circles has equations:

The envelope condition is

One can easily check that the point of the nephroid  is a solution of the system  and hence a point of the envelope of the pencil of circles.

Nephroid as envelope of a pencil of lines 

Similar to the generation of a cardioid as envelope of a pencil of lines the following procedure holds:
 Draw a circle, divide its perimeter into equal spaced parts with  points (see diagram) and number them consecutively.
 Draw the chords: . (i.e.: The second point is moved by threefold velocity.)
 The envelope of these chords is a nephroid.

Proof
The following consideration uses trigonometric formulae for
. In order to keep the calculations simple, the proof is given for the nephroid with cusps on the y-axis.
Equation of the tangent: for the nephroid with parametric representation 
: 
Herefrom one determines the normal vector , at first.

The equation of the tangent  is:

For  one gets the cusps of the nephroid, where there is no tangent.

Equation of the chord: to the circle with midpoint  and radius : The equation of the chord containing the two points  is:

For  the chord degenerates to a point.

The two angles  are defined differently ( is one half of the rolling angle,  is the parameter of the circle, whose chords are determined), for  one gets the same line. Hence any chord from the circle above is tangent to the nephroid and 
 the nephroid is the envelope of the chords of the circle.

Nephroid as caustic of one half of a circle  

The considerations made in the previous section give a proof for the fact, that the caustic of one half of a circle is a nephroid.

 If in the plane parallel light rays meet a reflecting half of a circle (see diagram), then the reflected rays are tangent to a nephroid.

Proof
The circle may have the origin as midpoint (as in the previous section) and its 
The circle has the parametric representation 

The tangent at the circle point  has normal vector  . The reflected ray has the normal vector (see diagram)  and containing circle point . Hence the reflected ray is part of the line with equation 

which is tangent to the nephroid of the previous section at point 
 (see above).

The evolute and involute of a nephroid

Evolute 
The evolute of a curve is the locus of centers of curvature. In detail: For a curve  with radius of curvature  the evolute has the representation

with  the suitably oriented unit normal.

For a nephroid one gets: 
The evolute of a nephroid is another nephroid half as large and rotated 90 degrees (see diagram).

Proof
The nephroid as shown in the picture has the parametric representation

the unit normal vector pointing to the center of curvature 
 (see section above)
and the radius of curvature  (s. section on metric properties).
Hence the evolute has the representation:

 

Involute 
Because the evolute of a nephroid is another nephroid, the involute of the nephroid is also another nephroid. The original nephroid in the image is the involute of the smaller nephroid.

Inversion of a nephroid 
The inversion 
 
across the circle with midpoint  and radius  maps the nephroid with equation 
 
onto the curve of degree 6 with equation 
  (see diagram) .

References 

Arganbright, D., Practical Handbook of Spreadsheet Curves and Geometric Constructions, CRC Press, 1939,  p. 54.
 Borceux, F., A Differential Approach to Geometry: Geometric Trilogy III, Springer, 2014, p. 148.
Lockwood, E. H., A Book of Curves, Cambridge University Press, 1961, p. 7.

External links 

 Mathworld: nephroid
 Xahlee: nephroid

Roulettes (curve)